In surgery, a guillotine amputation is an amputation performed without closure of the skin in an urgent setting. Typical indications include catastrophic trauma or infection control in the setting of infected gangrene.

References

Types of amputations
Surgery